Kobe is a unisex given name that has multiple origins and meanings. Origins include Hebrew, Dutch, Swahili, Japanese and Greek origins. Alternate spellings of this name are Coby, Koby, Kobi, Colby, and Cobe.

Origins
The first known use of the name was in Biblical times when the name "Koby" was used as a pet-name for Jacob. The Hebrew meaning is rooted to the words Yakov (Jacob) meaning "Yahweh (God) may protect. It can also be translated to "Supplanter", Held by the heel, leg puller and heel-grabber from the late Latin word "Iacobus"  which is rooted to the Greek lakobos (Ἰάκωβος) which is connected to the base name Jacob and used as a diminutive (nickname) form for Jacob.

The Swahili meaning of the name Kobe translate to "tortoise" or "turtle". The Dutch meaning is similar to the Hebrew meaning but the name is a diminutive for Jakob instead of Jacob.

Popularity

The use of the name has spiked with the popularity of American basketball player Kobe Bryant, with 14,000 children being given the name over his 20-year NBA career. He was named after the Japanese dish Kobe beef when his parents spotted it on a menu. Between 1985 and 1995 there were only 14 recorded births in the United States given this name. Later, there were 87 born with this name in the year of 1996 alone, the year in which Bryant was drafted into the NBA. According to the United states social security statistics from 2000 to 2018 it has declined in popularity in the United States, starting in the top 300, but down to 574th most common name in 2018. The gender of this name is 98.02% male and 1.98% female.

People with the name "Kobe" include

 Kobe Bryant (1978–2020), American basketball player
 Kobe Bufkin (born 2003), American basketball player
 Kobe Goossens (born 1996), Belgian cyclist
 Kobe Hetherington (born 1999),  Australian rugby league footballer
 Kobe Hernandez-Foster (born 2002), American soccer player
 Kobe Jones (born 1998), American football player
 Kobe Mutch (born 1998), Australian rules footballer 
 Kobe Paras (born 1997), Filipino basketball player
 Kobe Perez (born 1997), American soccer player
 Kobe Smith (born 1998), American football player
 Kobe Tai, American pornographic actress

See also
 
 Kobe (surname)
 Kobe (disambiguation), including people known by the mononym
 Coby, given name and surname

References 

Given names of Greek language origin
Given names
Modern names of Hebrew origin
Latin given names
Unisex given names
Swahili-language surnames
English unisex given names
Japanese given names